Trechus cautus is a species of ground beetle in the subfamily Trechinae. It was described by Thomas Vernon Wollaston in 1854.

References

cautus
Beetles described in 1854